Isa textula, the crowned slug moth or skiff moth is a moth of the family Limacodidae. It is found in North America from Minnesota, southern Ontario and Massachusetts to Florida, Texas, and Mississippi.

The larvae feed on the leaves of various trees, including oak, cherry, maple, basswood, elm and beech. Early instars leave zigzagging tracks in the underside of leaves. They are pale green and flattened and have lobes with stinging spines and additional stinging hairs which run down the back.

Another moth, Prolimacodes badia, is also referred to by the common name skiff moth.

References

Gallery

Moths described in 1854
Limacodidae
Moths of North America
Taxa named by Gottlieb August Wilhelm Herrich-Schäffer